Ri Chung-il (born 2 January 1996) is a North Korean footballer. He represented North Korea on at least one occasion in 2016.

Career statistics

International

References

1996 births
Living people
People from Hamhung
North Korean footballers
North Korea international footballers
Association football midfielders